is a Japanese photographer.

References

Japanese photographers
1962 births
Living people
Japanese women photographers
Place of birth missing (living people)
Date of birth missing (living people)